In Christian theology, the gift of miracles is among the spiritual gifts (charismata) mentioned by St. Paul in his First Epistle to the Corinthians. As a charism, the gift is imparted to individuals by the power of the Holy Spirit. The view of Cessationism held that the charismata were exclusively for Apostolic times, and therefore the gift of miracles ceased with the writing of the last book of the Bible or the death of St. John the Apostle.  In Continuationism, on the other hand, the gifts are held to be possible throughout the history of Christianity, and to have occurred since Apostolic times.

Catholicism

In Catholicism, the gift is one of the extraordinary graces of the Holy Spirit God imparted to certain persons so that Christ's doctrine may become credible and Christians confirmed in their faith. Although miracles are necessarily the work of God, saintly men and angels of God, headed by Saint Michael the Archangel, may be said to work miracles in a threefold way:

 by their prayers invoking a miraculous effect like the Suffrage Mass;
 by disposing or accommodating the materials, as it is said of the angels that they will in the Resurrection of the flesh collect the dust of the dead bodies that these may be re-animated by the divine power (cf. );
 by performing some other act in co-operation with the divine mercy, as in the case of the application of relics, or of visits to holy places which God has marked out for special and extraordinary favours of this kind. 

Like other charismata, these are special and extraordinary powers vouchsafed by God only to a few, and primarily for the spiritual good of others rather than of the recipient. 

The gift of thaumaturgy deals with the miracles of Jesus and the transmission of the divine grace through the Apostolic succession. Roman Catholic priests and bishops administer the Sacrament of the Anointing of the sicks by imposition of their hands with the holy chrism (cf. ). The related liturgy is regulated within the Ordo Unctionis Infirmorum eorumque Pastoralis Curae and the De Benedictionibus of the Roman Ritual. The sacrament does not promise healing (to be related to  ).

Moreover, the intercession of saints may mediate the divine grace of a miracle by effect of the devotional prayer and of pious practices like the works of mercy.

Pentecostals and charismatics
In Pentecostal and charismatic Christianity, it is believed that God continues to operate this gift through believers with the gift of faith. This gift does not, however, make one a miracle worker since it is God who performs the miracle. The emphasis is on "the power of God operating by the Spirit of God in and through the Church of God". God always signifies or teaches something with miraculous manifestations.

See also
 Thaumaturgy

References

Further reading
 Grudem, Wayne A. (editor). Are Miraculous Gifts for Today? Zondervan, 1996. . Four authors each provide four viewpoints concerning spiritual gifts: Cessationist, "Open But Cautious", Third Wave, and Pentecostal/Charismatic.
 Deere, Jack. Surprised by the Power of the Spirit. Grand Rapids: Zondervan, 1993. . 
 Lim, David. "Spiritual Gifts" in Systematic Theology, A Pentecostal Perspective revised edition, edited by Stanley M. Horton.  Springfield, MO: Logion Press, 1994. .
 Wagner, C. Peter. Discover Your Spiritual Gifts: The Easy-To-Use, Self-Guided Questionnaire That Helps You Identify and Understand Your Various God-Given Spiritual Gifts, expanded edition. Regal, 2010. .
 Wimber, John and Springer, Kevin. Power Evangelism, revised and enlarged edition. Regal, 2009 (originally 1986). .

Miracles, gift of
Christian miracles
Miracles, gift of
Holy Spirit